Rafaela Porras Ayllón (1 March 1850 - 6 January 1925) was a Spanish Roman Catholic professed religious who established the Handmaids of the Sacred Heart of Jesus in conjunction with her sister Dolores ; upon becoming a nun she assumed the religious name of "Mary of the Sacred Heart of Jesus". She was a nun for most of her life and devoted herself to the management of the congregation and resided in Rome until her death after her resignation as the order's superior in 1893.

The approval of two miracles attributed to her intercession allowed for Pope Pius XII to preside over her beatification in 1952 and the approval of a third miracle allowed for Pope Paul VI to canonize her as a saint of the Roman Catholic Church in 1977; she is the patron of her order.

Life
Rafaela Porras Ayllón was born in Pedro Abad on 1 March 1850 as the daughter of Ildefonso Porras (the mayor of Córdoba) and Rafaela Castilo as the tenth of thirteen children; she had one sole sister and eleven brothers. Her father died in 1854 while tending to victims of a cholera epidemic and her mother later followed in 1869. Her devotion to Jesus Christ during her childhood was ever so profound and she visited her parish on a frequent basis. The death of her mother served to motivate her more to devote herself to God.

She took a vow of perpetual chastity to God on 25 March 1865 on the Feast of the Annunciation. In February 1874 she and her sister María Dolores travelled to the convent of Poor Clare nuns in their hometown in order to discern what their vocation was. The two sisters were clothed with the habit for the first time on 4 June 1874 and so commenced their novitiate and joined a group of 21 other novices. 

In 1875, the two entered a religious congregation - the Sisters of Mary Reparatrix - and it was there that she assumed her new religious name of "María of the Sacred Heart of Jesus". The pair remained there when the congregation moved to Seville; with the aid of Bishop Zeferino González y Díaz Tuñón founded the Institute of Adorers of the Blessed Sacrament and Daughters of Mary Immaculate - this would be the origin of the order that she and her sister would establish not long after. The group went to Madrid to make their vows in 1877.

With her sister and sixteen religious the group moved to Andujar and then to Madrid; the order received the diocesan approval of the Cardinal Archbishop of Toledo Juan de la Cruz Ignacio Moreno y Maisonave on 14 April 1877. She made brief vows on 8 June 1877 and then made her perpetual profession on 8 November 1888. The congregation received the papal decree of praise of Pope Leo XIII in 1886 at which point the congregation was officiated in the name of the Handmaids of the Sacred Heart of Jesus and issued his papal approval in 1887. The order would grow with new institutes being formed in Zaragoza (1885) and Bilbao (1886) in Spain and with a house in Rome (1892) being established as well. She was appointed as the Superior of her order and remained in that post until 3 March 1893 when she resigned and anointed her sister as her successor; she then withdrew to the house in Rome and spent the remainder of her life there. She had resigned because of misunderstandings with her colleagues thus deemed it prudent to step aside from her position.

She died in her room in Rome in 1925. Her death came at the point where the benediction of the Eucharist took place in the convent chapel close to her room. She is buried in Rome at the institute based there.

Sainthood

The beatification process commenced in Rome with a diocesan process that spanned from 1 February 1936 until 1938 and the process saw the collection of documentation pertaining to her life as well as collating a range of testimonies from those who knew her. The decree on her writings was granted on 21 September 1938 after all of her writings were placed in the care of theologians for investigation in order to ensure that her written works did not contradict Church doctrine.

These processes took place despite the fact that the Congregation of Rites did not grant their formal approval to the initiation of the cause until 22 November 1939 which granted her the title Servant of God and allowed for another process to open to continue the work of the first; this spanned from 1940 until 1941 and both processes were ratified in 1943.

She was proclaimed to be Venerable on 13 May 1949 after Pope Pius XII recognized the fact that she had indeed lived a model and pious life of the heroic virtue that was required for the cause. The same pontiff presided over her beatification on 18 May 1952 after he approved two healings deemed to be miracles wrought from her direct intercession.

The third miracle - and the one required for her to be proclaimed a saint - was investigated in Huelva in 1974 and once completed was ratified on 15 November 1974. The miracle received papal approval on 13 November 1976 and allowed for Pope Paul VI to canonize her as a saint of the Roman Catholic Church on 23 January 1977. The miracle in question was the healing of the nun Maria of the Incarnation García Gallardo.

See also
Catholic Church in Spain

References

External links
Hagiography Circle
Saints SQPN
Handmaids of the Sacred Heart of Jesus

1850 births
1925 deaths
19th-century venerated Christians
19th-century Spanish nuns
20th-century venerated Christians
20th-century Spanish nuns
Beatifications by Pope Pius XII
Canonizations by Pope Paul VI
Founders of Catholic religious communities
People from the Province of Córdoba (Spain)
Spanish Roman Catholic saints